Soren M. Petersen (born October 5, 1960) is an American Republican politician who serves in the Kansas Senate, representing the 28th district since 2005.

Committee assignments
Petersen serves on these legislative committees:
 Joint Committee on Information Technology (chair)
 Transportation (chair)
 Utilities (vice-chair)
 Joint Committee on Kansas Security
 Clean Power Plan Implementation Study Committee
 Judiciary
 Telecommunications Study Committee
 Assessment and Taxation
 Transportation and Public Safety Subcommittee, Ways and Means

Elections

2012
Petersen was unopposed in the 2012 Republican primary, winning 2,632 votes. He defeated Democratic nominee Keith Humphrey by a margin of 9,853 to 7,957 in the general election — a 52.7- to 47.3-percent margin.

2016
Petersen faced Jo Hillman in the 2016 Republican primary, winning with a margin of 74% to 25% of the vote.
In the general election, he defeated Keith Humphrey once again, winning by a margin of 9,915 to 9,353 votes.

Personal life
He is an industrial electrician from Wichita, and is married to Shelby Petersen.

References

External links
Kansas Senate
Project Vote Smart profile
 Follow the Money campaign contributions
 1996, 1998, 2000, 2004, 2006, 2008
Ballotpedia

Republican Party Kansas state senators
Living people
1960 births
21st-century American politicians